This article is about the demographic features of the population of Norway, including population density, ethnicity, education level, health of the populace, economic status, religious affiliations and other aspects of the population.

Population

The total population of Norway on 1 January 2021 was 5,391,369. Statistics Norway estimated that the 5,000,000 milestone was reached on 19 March 2012.

The following demographic statistics are from the World Population Review.
 One birth every 8 minutes
 One death every 13 minutes
 One net migrant every 19 minutes
 Net gain of one person every 10 minutes

Growth rate
In 2020:
 Norway: 0.4%
 Northern Norway: -0.4%
 Southern Norway: 0.5%
 Eastern Norway: 0.6%
 Trøndelag: 0.5%
 Western Norway: 0.4%

Fertility

The total fertility rate is the number of children born per woman. It is based on fairly good data for the entire period. Sources: Our World In Data and Gapminder Foundation.

Total fertility rate

1.85 children born/woman (2018 est.) Country comparison to the world: 143rd
Mother's mean age at first birth

28.9 years

Birth rate

12.2 births/1,000 population (2018 est.) Country comparison to the world: 160th

Life expectancy 

Sources: Our World In Data and the United Nations.

1543–1950

1950–2015

Source: UN World Population Prospects

Life expectancy at birth

total population: 82 years. Country comparison to the world: 22nd
male: 79.9 years
female: 84.1 years (2018 est.)
Death rate

8 deaths/1,000 population (2018 est.) Country comparison to the world: 90th

Age structure 

0–14 years: 18.0% (male 495,403 /female 471,014) (2018 est.)
15–24 years: 12.4% (male 340,672 /female 324,088)
25–54 years: 41.0% (male 1,136,373 /female 1,065,138)
55–64 years: 11.7% (male 318,898 /female 310,668)
65 years and over: 16.9% (male 420,178 /female 489,759)

Median age

total: 39.3 years. Country comparison to the world: 55th
male: 38.6 years
female: 40 years (2018 est.)

Population density 

Urbanization
urban population: 82.2% of total population (2018)
rate of urbanization: 1.4% annual rate of change (2015–20 est.)
Note: data include Svalbard and Jan Mayen Islands

Vital statistics 

Data according to Statistics Norway, which collects the official statistics for Norway.

Current vital statistics

Ethnicity 

Statistics Norway does not attempt to quantify or track data on ethnicity. The national population registry records only country of birth.

As of 2012, an official government study shows that 75.2% of the total population are ethnic Norwegians (born in Norway with two parents also born in Norway).

Ethnically, the residents of Norway are predominantly Norwegians, a North Germanic ethnic group. In Northern Norway there is a population of Sámi people, who descend from people who probably settled the area a couple thousand years ago. The people who spoke the proto-Sámi language probably migrated from the Volga region in modern-day Russia in Eastern Europe through Finland, finally arriving in the northern portion of the Scandinavian peninsula where they would assimilate local Paleo-European hunter-gatherers who were already living in the region. The indigenous peoples and minorities of Norway include: Sámi, Scandinavian Romani, Roma, Jews, and Kvener, as well as a small Finnish community.

Immigration 

In the last decades, Norway has become home to increasing numbers of immigrants, foreign workers, and asylum-seekers from various parts of the world. Norway had a steady influx of immigrants from South Asia (mostly Pakistanis and Sri Lankans), East Asia (mainly Chinese), Pacific Islands and Southeast Asia (e.g. Filipinos), Eastern Europe (e.g. Russians) and Central Europe (e.g. Poles), Southern Europe (Greeks, Albanians and people from former Yugoslavia, Bosniaks, Serbs etc.), and Middle East countries (especially Iraqis and Kurdish Iranians), as well as Somalis, Turks, Moroccans, and some Latin Americans. After ten Eastern European and Baltic countries joined the EU in 2004, there has also been a substantial influx of people from Poland, Estonia, Latvia and Lithuania.

At the start of 2022, there were 819,356 immigrants and 205,819 Norwegian-born to immigrant parents in Norway, together constituting 18.9% of the total population. The same year, immigrants (and Norwegian born to immigrant parents) originating in the European Economic Area constituted 7.1% of the total number of Norwegian residents, while 6.3%  were from Asia including Turkey and 2.7% were from Africa.

Among people of African descent in Oslo, almost 60% are younger than 30, compared to 20% of those of North American background.

As of 2022, there are around 207,575 third generation immigrants in Norway. This means that all of their grandparents were born in a foreign country. The majority of these persons are of Western European and Northern European background with Sweden and Denmark accounting for 36,126 (17.4%) and 33,695 (16.2%) respectively. Other countries with significant third generation communities are the United States with 29,395 (14.1%), the United Kingdom with 17,882 (8.6%), Germany with 14,090 (6.8%), Finland with 6,213 (3%) and South Korea with 5,199 (2,5%).

Of these 1,025,175 immigrants and their descendants (born in Norway with two foreign born parents):
 419,720 (41%) have a Western background (UK, Australia, New Zealand, USA, Canada and the EU)
 88,192  (9%) have a different European background (e.g. Russia, Albania, Kosovo, Serbia, Bosnia and Herzegovina and Switzerland are included here)
 29,515 (3%) have a background from Latin America and the Caribbean
 144,868 (14%) have an African background
 342,571 (33%) have an Asian background, including Turkey

In 2012, of the total 660 000 with immigrant background, 407,262 had Norwegian citizenship (62.2 percent).
Immigrants were represented in all Norwegian municipalities.
The cities or municipalities with the highest share of immigrants in 2012 was Oslo (26 percent) and Drammen (18 percent). The share in Stavanger was 16%.  According to Reuters, Oslo is the "fastest growing city in Europe because of increased immigration". In recent years, immigration has accounted for most of Norway's population growth.

Employment and income 
Unemployment, youth ages 15–24
total: 10.4%. Country comparison to the world: 125th
male: 11.7%
female: 9% (2017 est.)

Religion

The Lutheran Church of Norway is the former state church and the vast majority remain at least nominal members. Other religions do, however, enjoy religious freedom and have prospered with immigration in recent years, particularly Islam and Roman Catholicism. Saint Olaf is the patron saint of Norway. He is regarded by some as the eternal king and has a reputation and place in history unchallenged by any other Norwegian King for the last 1000 years.

Languages

Norwegian (the written standards Bokmål and Nynorsk). Uralic languages – South Sámi, Lule Sámi, North Sámi and Kven – are additional official languages of some municipalities.

See also 
 Demographics of Svalbard
 Aging of Europe

Notes

References